Mona Kuhn (born 1969 in São Paulo, Brazil) is a German-Brazilian contemporary photographer best known for her large-scale photographs of the human form and essence. An underlying current in Kuhn's work is her reflection on our longing for spiritual connection and solidarity. As a result, her approach is unusual in that she develops close relationships with her subjects, resulting in images of remarkable intimacy. Kuhn's work shows the human body in its natural state while simultaneously re-interpreting the nude as a contemporary canon of art. Her work often references classical themes, has been exhibited internationally, and is held in several collections including the J. Paul Getty Museum, The Los Angeles County Museum of Art, the Hammer Museum and the Pérez Art Museum Miami.

Born in São Paulo, Brazil to parents of German ancestry, Mona Kuhn lives and works in Los Angeles, United States.

Early life
Mona Kuhn began taking photographs at age 12, when her parents gave her a Kodak camera for her birthday. Kuhn has attributed her interest to her early formative years:

“I didn’t grow up with cousins and I didn’t grow up with grandparents … so I think I always had, since I was a child, a slight inner need to bond or to create a small family. I think that the people that I photograph, if I look at all my series, were all people that could have been my extended family. That’s how I treat them. And that’s the real little seed that maybe comes from infancy."

She moved to the United States in 1992 to attend Ohio State University and then furthered her studies at the San Francisco Art Institute, moving to San Francisco at the height of the Bay Area Figurative Movement. Kuhn has noted that her artistic influences shift as she is always looking to what is next and eager to learn something new, but has said: "I learned the most by looking at Richard Diebenkorn's composition, Lucian Freud's relationship with models, Georgia O'Keeffe's subtleties and Lee Miller's courage."

Art career
Kuhn chose the nude as the focus of her work because it represents a timeless canon and she was interested in the idea of the body as residence. Her early work focused on details of the body in black and white; she is quoted as saying:

"I was not yet comfortable photographing the full figure. As I became more comfortable and as I stepped back with the camera and started seeing more of the environment, I realized right away that color was very important … that color was all around and balancing color became very important for me, and it also became a source of inspiration. Every new series starts with me imagining a palette; and then I grow from there."

In an interview with  Vanity Fair, Kuhn described her approach to photographing the nude saying: "Photographing someone in the nude is my attempt to reach that moment of perfect balance, the light of awareness in the way we perceive life to be. The nude is present in my work not as a one-dimensional physical manifestation, but rather as a proof of our being, our presence in time, and ultimately caring for what will be lost." She further explains, "I’m most comfortable representing the nude as minimal, timeless, somewhat monastic, and mostly pensive. I enjoy the nuances, the elegance of simplicity; the rustic forms because it brings us close to our own nature and sense of self. My works are not meant to be of this time, but to transcend, in its basic form, the elements of time."

Kuhn's first monograph titled Photographs was published by Steidl in 2004. Photographs was followed by Evidence in 2007, which was accompanied with a short story by Frederic Tuten. Her next project, released in 2010, was a return to her homeland of Brazil, with a series titled Native and an accompanying monograph of the same name published by Steidl. In 2011, Kuhn released Bordeaux Series, also with a monograph published by Steidl, which is a collection of traditional portraits and landscapes. Kuhn's work has been described as "intimate and sensuous," "dreamlike" and "classical" in composition
and her approach is unusual in that she develops close relationships with her subjects, resulting in images of remarkable intimacy. Kuhn describes her relationship with her subjects saying: “My best work starts when they forget they are naked. We entered a parallel reality, something that is lifted from the everyday, a quiet moment that is floating there."

Kuhn describes her visual vocabulary as figurative, however recent works have begun explorations with abstraction. “I wanted to escape the body and photograph the human presence coming in and out of evidence, at times overexposed, at times hidden in shadows, like a desert mirage, a solitary figure who could have been the very first or last.”

In 2018, Kuhn released two monographs: She Disappeared into Complete Silence (Steidl) and Bushes & Succulents (Stanley Barker). Kuhn selected American architect  Robert Stone's glass house in the California desert as the setting for She Disappeared into Complete Silence saying: "In a way, the glass house with mirrors felt like an extension of my own camera, and the perfect setting for the series “She Disappeared into Complete Silence.” In that space, we were able to push representation into a series of images emphasizing a refracted presence and its metaphors. Many of the images were shot by observing tangents, and I enjoyed working with variations of basically the same material: sand, glass, and mirrors." In a 2018 interview with Kuhn, Betsy Morales interpreted Bushes & Succulents for Museé Magazine, "Pastel succulents and serene bodies are paired together to cast a hypnotic spell on the viewer that ultimately  female essence." 

In the same year, Kuhn presented her first immersive installation piece, Experimental, a 5,000-square-foot exhibition at The Fruit in Durham, North Carolina. Writer Julie M. Hamilton explains "In Experimental, Kuhn employs video projections, vinyl installation, and other mixed media to build her photos into an environment in which spectators can contemplate and deconstruct notions of the self. In this sense, the audience is the exhibit’s subject, performing the work as a participant." Kuhn explains that the immersive installation surrounds guests with sounds, images and projections that allow them to interact with her artwork, rather than simply observing it passively. Her photography, featured in the installation, utilizes a desert landscape and light to symbolically portray human self-discovery in a natural environment. Kuhn’s experimentation with reflections and light either reveals the interior of a subject or enshrouds them in shadow. By controlling the effects of light, Kuhn gives the appearance that her subjects are disappearing into the landscape.

In 2021, Thames & Hudson published Mona Kuhn: Works, a retrospective of Kuhn's career spanning more than twenty years and named her "one of the most respected contemporary photographers of her time." The volume includes previously unseen work and features images highlighting underlying themes from throughout Kuhn's career, namely her reflection on humanity’s longing for spiritual connection and solidarity. Kuhn's photographs are accompanied with texts by Rebecca Morse, Chris Littlewood, Darius Himes and Simon Baker and an interview with Elizabeth Avedon, providing insights into Kuhn’s creative process and the ways in which she works with her subjects and settings.

Other professional activities
In addition to fine art photography, Kuhn has an extensive career with fashion and editorial work. She shot Bottega Veneta's resort 2012 campaign and has collaborated with Chanel and Dior. She has photographed for numerous publications, including Numéro, Le Monde, Harper's Bazaar, and W (magazine). Her portrait subjects include Tom Hiddleston, Sarah Paulson and Liev Schrieber.

Kuhn has been invited to curate exhibitions, most recently curating a show for The Billboard Creative, which placed works by emerging and established artists on billboards across Los Angeles. She curated Under My Skin at Flowers Gallery in New York City in 2013 and juried (Un)Clothed at The Center for Fine Art Photography, also in 2013.

Kuhn teaches at UCLA and ArtCenter College of Design and has been an independent scholar at the Getty Research Institute in Los Angeles since 1998.

Selected exhibitions

Solo Exhibitions:
2021 Mona Kuhn: Works, Edwynn Houk Gallery, New York
2021 Mona Kuhn: Works, Flowers Gallery, London
2021 Mona Kuhn: Works, Galerie XII, Los Angeles + Paris + Shanghai
2021 Mona Kuhn: 835 Kings Road, Art, Design and Architecture Museum, Santa Barbara
2020 Still Light, Jardin du Bra'haus, Montée du Château, Clervaux, Luxembourg
2020 Mona Kuhn: Early Depictions, Flowers Gallery, London
2020 Intimate, UP Gallery, Taipei, Taiwan
2019 She Disappeared into Complete Silence, Cite de l’Image, Clervaux, Luxembourg
2019 Mona Kuhn: Intimate, UPGallery, Taipei, Taiwan
2019 Bushes and Succulents, Euqinom Gallery, San Francisco
2019 Mona Kuhn: She Disappeared, Jackson Fine Art, Atlanta
2018 Mona Kuhn: Experimental, Fruit Factory, Durham Triangle, North Carolina
2018 Mona Kuhn: New Works, Part II, Galerie Catherine Hug, Paris, France
2018 Mona Kuhn: Selected Works, Porch Gallery, Ojai, California
2017 Mona Kuhn: The First Chapter, Euqinom Projects, San Francisco, California
2016 Mona Kuhn: New Works, Galerie Catherine Hug, Paris, France
2016 Mona Kuhn: Acido Dorado, Galeria Pilar Serra, Madrid, Spain
2015 Private, Galerie Ernst Hilger, Vienna, Austria
2015 Private, Flowers Gallery, London, England
2015 Private, Jackson Fine Art, Atlanta
2014 Acido Dorado, Edwynn Houk Gallery, New York
2014 Acido Dorado, Flowers Gallery, London
2012 Bordeaux Series, Galerie Particuliere, Paris, France
2012 Native, Galeria Pilar Serra, Madrid, Spain
2012 Bordeaux Series, Jackson Fine Art, Atlanta
2012 Bordeaux, Flowers Gallery, New York, New York
2012 Native, Brancolini Grimaldi, Florence, Italy
2011 Bordeaux, Flowers Gallery, London, England
2010 Native, Flowers Gallery, London, England
2010 Native, Flowers Gallery, New York, New York
2009 Native, M+B Gallery, Los Angeles, California
2009 Native, Jackson Fine Art, Atlanta, Georgia
2008 Evidence, Jarach Gallery, Venice, Italy
2007 Evidence, Scott Nichols Gallery, San Francisco, California
2007 Evidence, Charles Cowles Gallery, New York, New York
2007 Mona Kuhn, Estiarte Gallery, Madrid, Spain
2007 Evidence, Jackson Fine Art, Atlanta, Georgia
2007 Less Than Innocent, M+B Gallery, Los Angeles, California
2005 Mona Kuhn – Recent Color Work, Charles Cowles Gallery, New York, New York
2005 Mona Kuhn-Close, Jackson Fine Art, Atlanta, Georgia
2005 Unbounded Youth, Fahey/Klein Gallery, Los Angeles, California
2004 Mona Kuhn-Color, Camerawork, Berlin, Germany
2004 New Work, G. Gibson Gallery, Seattle, Washington
2004 Corporeal Space, Galerie F5.6, Munique, Germany
2004 Mona Kuhn – Color Photographs, Scott Nichols Gallery, San Francisco, California
2004 Still Memory, PhotoEye Gallery, Santa Fe, New Mexico
2004 Body Language, Camerawork AG, Hamburg, Germany 
2003 Somata, Schumann Galerie, Munique, Germany 
2002 Mona Kuhn-recent work, Momus Gallery, Atlanta, Georgia 
2001 Mona Kuhn-recent work, Scott Nichols Gallery, San Francisco, California 
2001 Bare, Yossi Milo Gallery, New York, New York 
2001 Mona Kuhn, Bassetti Fine Art Photo Gallery, New Orleans, Louisiana 
2000 Bei Nahe, Bodo Niemann Galerie, Berlin, Germany 
2000 Mona Kuhn, G.Gibson Gallery, Seattle, Washington
1999 Mona Kuhn-recent work, Scott Nichols Gallery, San Francisco, California
1998 Mona Kuhn Nus, Elkis Gallery, São Paulo, Brazil
1997 Mona Kuhn, Tappert Galerie, Berlin, Germany

Group Exhibitions: 
2021 Beyond Appearances, Kunstraum, Brooklyn, New York
2021 Keeper of the Hearth, Houston Center for Photography, Texas
2021 Women On Women, Galerie XII, Los Angeles
2020 Unseen: 35 Years of Collecting Photographs, The J. Paul Getty Museum, Los Angeles
2020 Isolation: Solitary & Suspended, Flowers Gallery, London, UK
2020 Eros and Psyche in Photography, Chaussee 36, Berlin, Germany
2020 14th Julia Margaret Cameron Awards Exhibition, Mediterranean House of Photography, Barcelona
2020 A Handful of Dust, Taipei Fine Arts Museum, Taiwan
2020 Picturing Roland Barthes, Meadows Museum of Art, Louisiana
2019 Her Ground: Women Photographing Landscape, Flowers Gallery, London, UK
2019 From Cosmic to the Domestic, The Polygon, Vancouver, Canada
2019 Contemporary II, Flowers Gallery, London, UK
2018 A Handful of Dust: from the Cosmic to the Domestic, The Polygon Gallery, Vancouver, Canada
2018 Anna Atkins Refracted: Contemporary Works, New York Public Library, New York
2018 Haute Photographie, Rotterdam, The Netherlands
2018 A Handful of Dust, UCR/California Museum of Photography, Riverside, California
2018 Staged, PhotoFairs, San Francisco, California
2018 This is Not a Selfie, Williamson Gallery, Pasadena, California
2017 A Handful of Dust, Whitechapel Gallery, London, UK
2017 Nudes, Gallery Grob, Geneva, Switzerland
2017 Spring Show, Flowers Gallery, London, UK
2017 JAM!, The Billboard Creative, Los Angeles, California
2017 Private at Art Rotterdam, The Ravestijn Gallery, Amsterdam, The Netherlands
2017 Poems at Art Geneve, Gallery Grob, Geneva, Switzerland
2016 Boundless, Museum of Photographic Arts, San Diego, California
2016 Out of Obscurity, Flowers Gallery, London, UK
2016 Contemporary California Artists, Museum of Photographic Arts, San Diego, California
2016 Love Potions, Maloney Fine Art, Los Angeles
2015 The Billboard Creative, Los Angeles
2014 Human Nature: Boomoon, Nadav Kander and Mona Kuhn, Flowers Gallery, London, England
2014 Living Rooms: Robert Wilson Collection, Le Louvre, Paris, France
2013 Image Search, Pérez Art Museum Miami, Florida
2013 Staking Claim, Museum of Photographic Arts, San Diego
2013 Under My Skin: Contemporary Nudes, Flowers Gallery, New York
2013 The Salt in My Skin: Mona Kuhn and Esther Teichmann, Flowers Gallery, London
2013 Mona Kuhn and Carla van de Puttelaar, Kahmann Gallery, Amsterdam
2013 Spring Photography Selection, Flowers Gallery, London
2012 Nudes, Flowers Gallery, New York
2011 Magie des Objekts, Leopold Museum, Vienna, Austria
2011 Royal Academy of Arts, Summer Exhibition, London, England
2011 Traummänner, Deichtorhallen Hamburg, Germany
2011 100 Portraits, Australian Center for Photography, Sydney
2010 State of Mind, Museum of Photographic Arts, San Diego, California
2009 On the way to Robert Frank, Musée de l'Elysée, Lausanne, Switzerland
2009 Au Feminin, Centre Culturel Calouste Gulbenkian, Paris, France
2009 Anonymity, Sol Mednick Gallery, University of the Arts, Philadelphia, Pennsylvania
2008 Modern Photographs, The Parrish Art Museum, Southampton, New York
2008 People and Places, Southwest Center for Contemporary Art, North Carolina
2007 Featured Works of Contemporary Art, North Carolina Museum of Art, North Carolina
2007 The Machine, the Body and the City, Miami Museum of Art, Florida
2006 The Body Familiar, Current Perspectives of the Nude, Griffin Museum, Boston, Massachusetts
2005 Portrait & Figure Study in Contemporary Photography, Westport Arts Center, Connecticut
2005 Face Cachée, Galerie Esther Woerdehoff, Paris, France
2005 The Children’s Hour, Museum of New Art, Michigan
2004 Il nudo nell’arte, Galleria d’Arte Moderna, Bologna, Italy
2003 Traditions on Figure, G. Gibson Gallery, Seattle, Washington
2002 March Group Exhibition, G.Gibson Gallery, Seattle, Washington
2002 Collective, Vickie Bassetti Fine Art, New Orleans, Louisiana
2001 Love and Trust, Momus Gallery, Atlanta, Georgia
2001 Best of 2001 curated by Jack Spencer, Cumberland Gallery, Tennessee
2001 PhotoMetro, SFAC Gallery, San Francisco, California
2000 German Artists, Scott Nichols Gallery, San Francisco, California
2000 Among Us, Paba Gallery, New Haven, Connecticut
2000 Collective, G. Gibson Gallery, Seattle, Washington
2000 The Body in Art, Francoise Gallery, Maryland, Virginia
2000 Nudes from Past to Present, Etherton Gallery, Tucson, Arizona
2000 Love, Vorpal Gallery, San Francisco, California
1999 Collective Figurative Artists, Mauritz Gallery, Columbus, Ohio
1999 Female Figures, WomanMade Gallery, Chicago, Illinois
1998 Bare Skin, Columbus Museum of Art, Columbus, Ohio
1998 Minimal Skin, Museum of Arts Downtown, Los Angeles, California
1998 Collective Figurative, Museum Of Arts Downtown Los Angeles, California
1997 Contemporary Women Photographers, Scott Nichols Gallery, SF, California
1997 Brazilian Contemporary Art, Mission Cultural Center, San Francisco, California

Selected collections
The J. Paul Getty Museum, Los Angeles
Los Angeles County Museum of Art, California
Hammer Museum, Los Angeles
Griffin Museum, Winchester, Massachusetts
George Eastman House Museum, Rochester
Museum of Fine Arts, Houston, Texas
Musée de l'Elysée, Lausanne, Switzerland
Musée de la Photographie de Charleroi, Belgium
Hiroshima Peace Memorial Museum, Japan
Kiyosato Museum of Photographic Arts, Japan
Museum of Photographic Arts, San Diego
Santa Barbara Museum of Art, California
Perez Art Museum Miami, Miami, Florida
Milwaukee Art Museum, Milwaukee, Wisconsin
The Byrd Hoffman Watermill Foundation, New York
di Rosa Foundation, San Francisco, California 
Buhl Foundation, New York, New York
Sir Elton John Collection, United Kingdom
Paul Allen Collection, Seattle, Washington
Allen Thomas Jr. Collection, North Carolina
Schwarz Contemporary Art Collection, Berlin, Germany 
Nicolaus von Oesterreich Collection, Frankfurt, Germany

Books

Awards

 The Stieglitz Award (2021)
 The Julia Margaret Cameron Award (2019)

References

External links

 Mona Kuhn's Website
 Edwynn Houk Gallery, Mona Kuhn
 Flowers Gallery, Mona Kuhn
 Jackson Fine Art, Mona Kuhn
 Euqinom Gallery, Mona Kuhn
 Ravestijn Gallery, Mona Kuhn
 Artnet: Mona Kuhn

1969 births
Living people
Brazilian expatriates in the United States
Brazilian people of German descent
Brazilian photographers
Ohio State University alumni
People from São Paulo
San Francisco Art Institute alumni
Brazilian women photographers